The Cathedral of St. Andrew the Apostle, also known as the Pitsunda Cathedral or Bichvinta Cathedral is an Eastern Orthodox Cathedral located in Pitsunda, in the Gagra District of the de facto independent Republic of Abkhazia, internationally recognised as constituting a part of Georgia. The cathedral is currently used by the schismatic Abkhazian Orthodox Church and serves as that body's seat, although this usage is disputed by the Georgian Orthodox Church and is considered irregular by the Eastern Orthodox communion generally.

Pitsunda Cathedral was built at the end of the 10th century by King Bagrat III of Georgia. It served as the seat of the Georgian Orthodox Catholicate of Abkhazia until the late 16th century when Abkhazia came under the Ottoman hegemony. According to 17th century French traveller Jean Chardin, Catholicos, who no longer lived in Pitsunda, visited the cathedral once a year with the retinue of bishops and princes to perform the sanctification of chrism. The cathedral was reconsecrated in 1869 when Abkhazia was already a part of Russian Empire.

It is a cross-domed cathedral with three naves and three apses, shaped as a rectangle with extending semicircular apses. The cathedral is notable for its impressive size, reaching 29 m high (including the dome), 37 m long and 25 m wide; the walls are up to 1.5 m thick. The building rests on heavy slabs of grey sandstone; the walls are made up of alternating rows of stone and brickwork, a typical technique for late Byzantine architecture. The cathedral contains vestiges of wall-painting from the 13th and the 16th centuries. A 12th-century Georgian manuscript of the Four Gospels, found at the cathedral in 1830, is now preserved at the Georgian National Center of Manuscripts in Tbilisi.

Gallery

References

External links 
Photos of the Pitsunda Cathedral
Photos and background information 
 Organ of Pitsunda. Official site

Georgian Orthodox cathedrals in Georgia (country)
Temples in Gagra Municipality
10th-century churches in Georgia (country)
Immovable Cultural Monuments of National Significance of Georgia
Orthodox cathedrals in Abkhazia